St. Paul's School is a 500-room brick edifice in the Village of Garden City, New York, United States.  As of 2010, the building is not currently used.

History
St. Paul's was built by Cornelia Stewart, widow of Alexander Stewart, and dedicated in his honor. This building is of High Victorian Gothic design.  The architect was William H Harris, who had also designed the Cathedral of the Incarnation. The cornerstone was laid on June 18, 1879, with attended by Cornelia Stewart, her brother Charles Clinch, executor of Alexander Stewart's estate, Judge Henry Hilton, and Bishop Littlejohn, Protestant Episcopal Bishop of Long Island. It took James L'Hommedieu four years to complete construction of this massive E-shaped building. It was crowned with a slate roof and a clock and bell tower. There were laboratories, classrooms, libraries, several dining halls, kitchens, a large reception parlor, permanent workspaces for staff, a beautiful gothic chapel, with seating for 400, dormitory space for 300 students, with spacious interior apartments on the top floors for masters, i.e. teachers.

It opened in 1883 as a military school for boys, owned by the Cathedral of the Incarnation in the Episcopal Diocese of Long Island.  In 1884, the St. Paul's football team won the New York area championship.  The school also had baseball and ice hockey teams.  St. Paul's remained a military school for only 10 years, afterward becoming a college preparatory academy, modeled in the British tradition.  It designated academic years as Forms, with the first form being seventh grade, the second form corresponding to eighth grade, up to the sixth form being twelfth grade.  Students studied Latin and the classics.

At the turn of the 20th century, headmaster Father Frederick Luther Gamage stated the school's mission to be to "develop manly, Christian character, a strong physique, and the power to think."  During Father Gamage's tenure, a benefactor, George Bywater Cluett, an owner of the Cluett, Peabody and Company, a collar and shirt making firm in Troy, New York, provided funds for a gymnasium to be constructed as a memorial to Cluett's son, Alfonzo Rockwell Cluett, who had been a student of Headmaster Gamage, approximately class of 1896, and after graduating from Yale University in 1900, died the following Christmas Eve of typhoid fever. A swimming pool was built on the lower level of that gymnasium.

Approximately 1906, William Bradford Turner, a direct descendant of Massachuttes Bay Colony Governor William Bradford, enrolled at St. Paul's in the third form (i.e. ninth grade); Turner would later go on to posthumously win the Congressional Medal of Honor, being killed in World War I.

In 1907, Headmaster Gamage left St. Paul's, and some of its prestigious students, like Turner, and donors, like Cluett, went with him to found Trinity-Pawling School upstate.  However, the school continued to prosper.

After the World Series finished in 1917, the pennant winning teams, the Chicago White Sox and New York Giants, came to St. Paul's to play an exhibition baseball game to entertain the soldiers of the United States Army Rainbow Division, which was encamped nearby in Garden City. Participants in that game for the New York Giants included Manager John McGraw, and Jim Thorpe.  The White Sox players included those soon to be infamous in the Black Sox Scandal.

The brother of United States President Donald Trump, Fred Trump, graduated from St. Paul's in 1956.  Their father, Fred Trump Sr., donated money to improve the soccer field, which was temporarily renamed Trump Field.

In the late 1960s, the New York Jets entered into discussions to use St. Paul's as their practice facility, although the parties could not agree to terms, and the Jets used nearby Hofstra University instead.

In 1970, a new gymnasium field house was built, and named for Father Nicholas Feringa, the former headmaster.  At the opening, it was the largest indoor sports fieldhouse on Long Island, with four contiguous basketball courts. The New York Nets professional basketball team used it as their training facility, splitting the basketball complex with the students.  Future Hall of Famer Rick Barry was on the Nets at that time, with the Nets using the same gym and the same locker rooms concurrently with the St. Paul's students.

In 1991, St. Paul's owner, the Episcopal Diocese of Long Island, entered bankruptcy, and being forced to sell its assets, St. Paul's shut down.  The Village of Garden City negotiated a "friendly condemnation", and obtained the buildings and all 48 acres of land. The village has used the gymnasiums and athletic fields, but the village trustees have not been able to reach consensus on what to do with the main building, and therefore have ignored basic repairs needed for its maintenance, such as roof repairs.  As a result, the magnificent main buildings upper floors have been subject to flooding from rain, and the building decays further every year.
 
The AIA Architectural Guide to Nassau and Suffolk Counties describes the building as having "poly-chromatic voussoir arched windows, elaborate cast-iron balustrades, and Dorchester stone trim." The building was selected in 2003 by the Preservation League of New York State as one of its "Seven to Save" endangered properties.

Saint Paul's featured prominently in the book published by then President's Donald Trump's niece, Mary L. Trump, Too Much and Never Enough, in which she explains that both of President Trump's brothers, her own father Fred Trump Jr. and her uncle Robert Trump were alumni of Saint Paul's. The book goes on to describe pranks by Freddie Trump's friends including one by Homer Godwin.

Development and demolition

In 1993, the building was sold to the Incorporated Village of Garden City. The residents of Garden City were unable to come up with a viable plan to use the school for a different purpose.  The Mayor of Garden City appointed a committee to make recommend uses for the buildings which recommended that the property be redeveloped, and leased for 99 years to a private senior assisted living company.  The proposal was controversial because there was no municipal use of the buildings and because the proposal increased the building footprint and decreased green space, as well as lack of significant tax revenues.

In 1995, Tishman Speyer Properties conducted a preliminary inspection and evaluation on the potential to adapt the St. Paul's buildings as the new Garden City High School.  Tishman Speyer submitted four preliminary designs to the Garden City Board of Education for their consideration. The proposal was supported by many of the younger families; however, the Eastern Property Owners Association vigorously lobbied the Board of Education not to consider it out of fear it would cost more, and the Board of Education eventually took it off the table.  Ironically, the alternative cost of renovating the Garden City Middle and High School subsequently proved to be even more.
 
In 1996, a Village-wide opinion poll was held, with voters being offered a "yes" or "no", if they supported the Senior Assisted Living initiative at St. Paul's.  The vote was 50.1% opposed, and 49.9% in favor.

In 2004, the Village Board of the Incorporated Village of Garden City voted to dedicate St. Paul's School's 48 acre (194,000 m2) site as parkland, with then Mayor Barbara Miller voting twice to break the tie of 4 board members in favor and 4 members opposed, on December 16. Removal of its designation as parkland would require the approval of the New York State Legislature.

In 2008, a Village-wide opinion poll was held, and the results were  Approve Demolition: 2,272 votes (45.4%); Approve Mothballing of Main Building: 1,857 votes (37.1%); Approve of the Avalon Bay proposal: 873 votes (17.5%) - Total Voter Turnout 5,002. 
The Village Board of the Incorporated Village of Garden City is considering the demolition of the building to add to open space. It is currently undergoing environmental reviews of the demolition proposal.  Demolition would only save the village $100,000 a year in maintenance charges.

In 2014, an annex known as Ellis Hall, built in 1969 to provide additional school space, was demolished. Many people supported this, despite the fact that most preservation plans included saving this annex as well.

References

External links

Committee to Save St. Paul's 
Save St. Paul's Facebook Group
Article "Uncertain Fate for Long Island School"
Historic News Clipping from Old Days of St. Paul's School
News Clipping from Garden City Life reporting on the Dedication of St. Paul's School as Park Land
Incorporated Village of Garden City Website with links to St. Paul's "Village Facts"

Garden City, New York
Educational institutions established in 1879
School buildings on the National Register of Historic Places in New York (state)
Episcopal schools in the United States
Historic district contributing properties in New York (state)
National Register of Historic Places in Nassau County, New York
1879 establishments in New York (state)